Gremyachka is a rural locality in Lobazovsky Selsoviet Rural Settlement, Oktyabrsky District, Kursk Oblast, Russia. Population:

Geography 
The village is located on the Vorobzha River (a left tributary of the Seym River), 66 km from the Russia–Ukraine border, 23 km south-west of Kursk, 10 km south of the district center – the urban-type settlement Pryamitsyno, 2.5 km from the selsoviet center – Zhuravlino.

 Climate
Gremyachka has a warm-summer humid continental climate (Dfb in the Köppen climate classification).

Transport 
Gremyachka is located 9 km from the federal route  Crimea Highway (a part of the European route ), 1.5 km from the road of regional importance  ("Crimea Highway" – Ivanino, part of the European route ), on the road of intermunicipal significance  (Lobazovka – Gremyachka – Yuryevka), 11 km from the nearest railway station Dyakonovo (railway line Lgov I — Kursk).

The rural locality is situated 33 km from Kursk Vostochny Airport, 109 km from Belgorod International Airport and 230 km from Voronezh Peter the Great Airport.

References

Notes

Sources

Rural localities in Oktyabrsky District, Kursk Oblast